Debbie Stavrou is an English international lawn and indoor bowler.

In 2009, she won the women's singles title at the 2009 World Indoor Bowls Championship defeating Alison Merrien in the final. The following year a second successive title came her way when she beat Alison Merrien once again in the 2010 World Indoor Bowls Championship. In 2012, she won the mixed pairs final with David Gourlay.

References

English female bowls players
Living people
Year of birth missing (living people)
Indoor Bowls World Champions